Marina Isan Berga (born 12 April 1994) is a Spanish professional racing cyclist, who most recently rode for UCI Women's Continental Team .

References

External links

1994 births
Living people
Spanish female cyclists
Place of birth missing (living people)